The Calhoun County Courthouse in Morgan, Georgia, is located on the town's public square.

It was built in 1930.  It was designed in Colonial Revival style by T. Firth Lockwood, Jr.

References

County courthouses in Georgia (U.S. state)
Calhoun County, Georgia
1930 establishments in Georgia (U.S. state)